The Wörld Is Yours Tour was a tour performed by the heavy metal band Motörhead in support of their album, The Wörld Is Yours. During the tour Motorhead took part in opening for the Foo Fighters and Judas Priest, during their Wasting Light Tour and Epitaph World Tour respectively. During the tour, the band would take part Gigantour, the heavy metal music festival organized by Megadeth's Dave Mustaine.  

Former Guns 'N' Roses bassist Duff McKagan spoke highly of supporting the band in Germany with his band Loaded, saying that: "If you are a rock band of Loaded‘s size and ilk, playing Germany with Motorhead is like making it to The Show when you get called up to the major leagues in baseball. We have been “called up,” and even my wife and daughters from afar revere the great Lemmy, Phil Campbell and Mikkey Dee.

Personnel 
 Lemmy Kilmister – bass guitar, lead vocals
 Phil Campbell – guitar
 Mikkey Dee – drums

Setlists 

First setlist (Legs 1-7)
"We Are Motörhead" (Replaced by "Iron Fist" on Leg 2)
 "Stay Clean"
 "Metropolis"
 "Get Back in Line"
 "Over the Top"
 One Night Stand
 "Rock Out"
 Guitar Solo
 "The Thousand Names of God"
 "I Got Mine" (Dropped on Leg 3)
 "I Know How to Die"
 "The Chase Is Better Than the Catch"
 "In the Name of Tragedy" (with drum solo)
 "Going to Brazil"
 "Just 'Cos You Got the Power"
 "Killed by Death"
 "Ace of Spades"
Encore:
  "Overkill"

Second setlist (Leg 8)
"Bomber"
"Damage Case"
 "I Know How to Die"
 "Stay Clean"
 "Metropolis"
 "Over the Top"
 "One Night Stand"
 Guitar Solo
 "The Chase Is Better Than the Catch""
 "Get Back in Line"
 "Rock Out"
 "The One to Sing the Blues" (With drum solo)
"Orgasmatron"
 "Going to Brazil"
 "Killed by Death"
"Iron Fist"

Encore:
  "Whorehouse Blues"
 "Ace of Spades"
 "Overkill"

Gigantour Setlist
 "Bomber"
 "Damage Case"
 "I Know How to Die"
 "Stay Clean"
 "Over the Top"
 "The Chase Is Better Than the Catch"
 "The One to Sing the Blues" (with drum solo)
 "Going to Brazil
 "Killed by Death"
 "Ace of Spades"
 "Overkill"

Tour dates

References 

Motörhead concert tours
2011 concert tours
2012 concert tours